Lincoln Park is a city in Wayne County in the U.S. state of Michigan. The population was 38,144 at the 2010 census, down from 40,008 at the 2000 census.

Lincoln Park contains Council Point Park, which dates back to 1763 when Chief Pontiac met with other tribal leaders along the banks of the Ecorse River to plot a rebellion against increasing European settlers, specifically those in nearby Fort Detroit.  The Potawatomi eventually ceded the land to the French in 1776.    

Lincoln Park is considered part of the Downriver collection of communities within Metro Detroit.  The city borders Detroit to the north and also shares borders with Allen Park to the west, Ecorse to the east, Melvindale to the north, and Southgate and Wyandotte to the south.  It developed as a bedroom community, providing homes to workers in the nearby steel mills and automobile plants of the Detroit area, while having no industries of its own.  Lincoln Park was originally part of the now-defunct Ecorse Township, incorporating as a village in 1921 and again as a city in 1925.

History 

Long before Lincoln Park was incorporated as a city, an area along the Ecorse River was the site of a pivotal meeting during Pontiac's Rebellion. On April 27, 1763, a council of several American Indian tribes from the Detroit region listened to a speech from the Ottawa leader Pontiac. Pontiac urged the listeners to join him in a surprise attack on the British Fort Detroit, which they attempted on May 9. Today, the area is known as Council Point Park, and a small engraved boulder marks the site of the historic meeting.

Neighborhoods were first laid in the area of Ecorse Township that would become Lincoln Park in 1906.  It was incorporated as a village in 1921, and as a city in 1925.

Preston Tucker, famous for his controversial financing and development of the revolutionary 1948 Tucker Sedan, grew up in Lincoln Park in the early 1900s.  Tucker joined the Lincoln Park Police Department in his early years to gain access to the high performance cars the department used.

During the 20th century, Lincoln Park grew as a bedroom community for the numerous workers at Henry Ford's River Rouge Plant and other mills and factories of the auto industry. Two major shopping hubs were constructed in the 1950s: Lincoln Park Plaza in 1955 on the southeast side and the Lincoln Park Shopping Center the following year on the northwest side.

Among Lincoln Park's minor claims to fame is that it was the home of the members of the seminal punk rock group MC5 in the 1960s.  The band was rumored to have evolved out of the group's habit of listening to music from a car radio in the parking lot of the local White Castle restaurant in the small downtown area. Gary Grimshaw, a noted rock concert poster artist, grew up in Lincoln Park at the same time.

Geography 

The north and south branches of the Ecorse River run through Lincoln Park and join just before leaving the city.  Lincoln Park borders the cities of Detroit, Allen Park, Melvindale, Ecorse, Wyandotte, and Southgate.

Demographics

2010 census
As of the census of 2010, there were 38,144 people, 14,924 households, and 9,685 families living in the city. The racial makeup of the city was 84.2% White, 5.9% African American, 0.7% Native American, 0.5% Asian, 5.4% from other races, and 3.2% from two or more races. Hispanic or Latino of any race were 14.9% of the population.

There were 14,924 households, of which 34.4% had children under the age of 18 living with them, 40.8% were married couples living together, 16.9% had a female householder with no husband present, 7.2% had a male householder with no wife present, and 35.1% were non-families. 29.0% of all households were made up of individuals, and 9.8% had someone living alone who was 65 years of age or older. The average household size was 2.55 and the average family size was 3.13.

The median age in the city was 36.7 years. 24.8% of residents were under the age of 18; 8.7% were between the ages of 18 and 24; 28.7% were from 25 to 44; 26.3% were from 45 to 64; and 11.5% were 65 years of age or older. The gender makeup of the city was 49.0% male and 51.0% female.

2000 census
As of the census of 2000, there were 40,008 people, 16,204 households, and 10,581 families living in the city. The racial makeup of the city was 93.26% White, 2.06% Black or African American, 0.53% Native American, 0.51% Asian, 0.00% Pacific Islander, 1.82% from other races, and 1.81% from two or more races. 6.39% of the population were Hispanic or Latino of any race.

There were 16,204 households, out of which 30.2% had children under the age of 18 living with them, 46.3% were married couples living together, 13.3% had a female householder with no husband present, and 34.7% were non-families. 29.3% of all households were made up of individuals, and 11.3% had someone living alone who was 65 years of age or older.  The average household size was 2.46 and the average family size was 3.04.

In the city, the population was spread out, with 24.3% under the age of 18, 8.5% from 18 to 24, 32.7% from 25 to 44, 20.4% from 45 to 64, and 14.1% who were 65 years of age or older.  The median age was 36 years. For every 100 females, there were 95.7 males.  For every 100 females age 18 and over, there were 93.7 males.

The median income for a household in the city was $22,515, and the median income for a family was $29,747. Males had a median income of $10,197 versus $6,549 for females. The per capita income for the city was $14,140.  About 40.1% of families and 44.7% of the population were below the poverty line, including 20.3% of those under age 18 and 4.7% of those age 65 or over.

Ethnic groups 
Hispanics/Latinos make up about 15% of Lincoln Park residents. The city hosted its first Cinco de Mayo celebration in 2015. Many Hispanic businesses have opened along Dix Highway and Fort Street.

Highways

: former designation (decommissioned in 1973); ran concurrent with Interstate 75
: named locally as Southfield Road; terminus just west of M-85
: named locally as Fort Street
 Outer Drive forms most of the northern border of Lincoln Park with the cities of Detroit and Melvindale.

Education 

The city's education system is served by the Lincoln Park Public Schools primarily serving its 19,700 people under the age of 18.  The district includes Lincoln Park High School, Lincoln Park Middle School, Carr Elementary, James A. Foote Elementary, Hoover Elementary, Keppen Elementary, Lafayette Elementary, Paun Elementary, and Raupp Elementary.

Lincoln Park's private schools include Christ the Good Shepherd, which conformed with the schools of Mt. Carmel and Wyandotte Catholic to create Pope John Paul II.

Notable people
MC5, rock band formed in the city in 1964 
Dennis Brown, collegiate football player and coach
Arnold Earley, Major League Baseball pitcher from 1960–1967
Bill Morrison, comic book artist and writer
Larry Pashnick, Major League Baseball pitcher from 1982–1984
Bob Seger, singer, songwriter, and musician; attended Lincoln Park High School
Preston Tucker, automobile entrepreneur, designer of the Tucker 48

References

Notes

Sources

Further reading

External links 

 
 Lincoln Park Historical Society

Cities in Wayne County, Michigan
Metro Detroit
Populated places established in 1921
1921 establishments in Michigan